David Geoffrey Nigel Filkin, Baron Filkin,  (born 1 July 1944) is a British Labour politician.

Career
Filkin was educated at King Edward VI Five Ways School, Birmingham, and Clare College, Cambridge, where he read history. His early career was as a Director of Housing and then Chief Executive in Local Government. He was Chief Executive of the Association of District Councils, representing local authorities to government, promoting the foundation of the Local Government Association and creating Best Value, the policy for sourcing in local government. Later he was a policy analyst and writer, contributing to the development of Labour's policies for local and regional government. In 2000 he led the Prime Minister's Review of local government and subsequently was a government minister for four years.

Parliamentary career
Filkin, having been appointed a Commander of the Order of the British Empire in the 1997 New Year Honours, was created a life peer as Baron Filkin, of Pimlico in the City of Westminster, on 29 July 1999.
In 2000, with Simon Over, he founded the Parliament Choir, which gathers members of both Houses of Parliament and Parliamentary Staff.

He has held a number of Government offices, first as Lord in Waiting (junior Whip) from June 2001 to May 2002, then as Under-Secretary of State for the Home Department from May 2002 until June 2003, and then as Parliamentary Under-Secretary of State in the Departments for Constitutional Affairs (June 2003 to September 2004) and Education and Skills (September 2004 to May 2005).

He founded the Public Services Research Group which published Public Matters, a critical review of Labour's public service reforms and in 2008 he founded and chaired the charity, 2020 Public Services Trust. Its Commission into Public Services in 2020 reported in 2010. He led the report, Commissioning for Outcomes, proposing and explaining the policy of paying for results. He was made an Honorary Fellow of the Chartered Institute for Purchasing and Supply. He founded the Parliament Choir in 2000, chaired the Committee on Statutory Instruments from 2005 to 2010 and proposed and then chaired the Lords Select Committee on Public Services and Demographic Change. Its report, Ready for Ageing? was published in March 2013.

Geoffrey Filkin was Chair of the House of Lords Select Committee on Public Service and Democratic Change which published a report on "Ready for Ageing?".

Upon being appointed chair of the Big Lottery Fund's Centre for Ageing Better in November 2013, Filkin set aside the Labour whip, choosing to sit as a non-affiliated peer. Upon his resignation from the charity's chairmanship in 2018, Filkin returned to the Labour whip in January 2019.

References

External links
 They Work For You record of Lord Filkin's contributions in Parliament
 Houses of Parliament biography

1944 births
Living people
Alumni of Clare College, Cambridge
Commanders of the Order of the British Empire
Labour Party (UK) life peers
Government ministers of the United Kingdom
Life peers created by Elizabeth II